Louis J. G. Gooren (born 14 December 1943) is a Dutch endocrinologist known for his work with transsexual and transgender people. He has treated over 2,200 transsexual people and was one of the first physicians to treat transgender youth.

Life and career
Gooren was born in Wanssum. He earned his medical degree from the Catholic University of Nijmegen in 1970, then specialized in internal medicine and endocrinology at the Vrije Universiteit in Amsterdam. He founded the gender clinic (now known as the Center of Expertise on Gender Dysphoria) there in 1975, and he graduated in 1976. Gooren then studied with John Money at Johns Hopkins University in Baltimore. He earned his board certification in internal medicine and endocrinology in 1977, and completed his Ph.D. on testicular hormones in 1981.

In 1988 he became Professor of Endocrinology and held the special position Professor of Transsexuality at the Vrije Universiteit. He was featured in the 2005 documentary, Middle Sexes: Redefining He and She.

Gooren has been professor emeritus at Vrije Universiteit since 2008, and he works as a consultant in Chiang Mai, Thailand. His work also covers gender identity and human sexual differentiation.

Gooren has also published research on male menopause. He holds an honorary professorship in male health at Hang Tuah University in Surabaya, Indonesia.

References

External links

Gooren, Louis (April 16, 1993). Closing speech at Transsexualism, medicine and law speech (via Press for Change)

1943 births
Living people
Dutch endocrinologists
Radboud University Nijmegen alumni
Gender transitioning and medicine